Blood Orange is a 2016 film noir directed by Toby Tobias and starring Iggy Pop as an ageing rock star (Bill) and Kacey Barnfield as his young wife (Isabelle). It is notable because it marked the first time that the well-known singer Iggy Pop had played a lead role in a film (although he had had previously had cameo roles in several films).

Plot
In a stunning modern Spanish Villa lives Bill, an aging, half-blind rock star lives with his young, very beautiful and sexually promiscuous wife Isabelle. Into their Ibizan paradise comes Lucas, an ex-lover looking for revenge. Lucas wants his inheritance back; he believes she stole it from him, but Isabelle will give him nothing. Bill asks Lucas to stay and to make peace with Isabelle, but really he has another agenda - he has a plan... Meanwhile, Lucas is already torn up inside with the desire for revenge, and when he sees how Isabelle is having one of her flings with David their Spanish 'pool boy' he sees an opportunity to turn the tables and things spiral dangerously out of control.

Cast
 Iggy Pop as Bill
 Kacey Barnfield as Isabelle
 Ben Lamb as Lucas 
 Antonio Magro as David

Critical reception
In the UK, the film received a generally favourable review in the Radio Times, which commented that "the twist isn't entirely concealed, but it is surprisingly atmospheric and artful" and a slightly less favourable review in The Guardian, which gave the film three stars out of a maximum possible five. The critic Stuart Bannerman described the film as “one of the highlights of my film viewing year”, and as “very well directed and filmed in beautiful locations”. The Hollywood Reporter was more critical, commenting that Iggy Pop “oozes craggy charisma in his first starring role” and that his “casting should give it cult appeal in theaters”, but also describing the film as "more self-conscious homage to vintage film noir than a fully rounded addition to the genre", and criticising director Tobias for requiring Barnfield to appear nude in several scenes, commenting that "for male-written female-fantasy figures, the line between empowerment and exploitation is often a fuzzy one".

DVD release

Blood Orange (2016 film) is available in both Region 2 DVD (Europe) and Region 4 DVD (Australia). There is no Region 1 DVD available.

References

External links 
 

2016 films